Melphina unistriga, the common forest swift, is a butterfly in the family Hesperiidae. It is found in Sierra Leone, Liberia, Ivory Coast, Ghana, Togo, Nigeria, Cameroon, Gabon, the Republic of the Congo, the Central African Republic, the Democratic Republic of the Congo and Uganda. The habitat consists of forests with a closed canopy.

References

Butterflies described in 1893
Erionotini
Butterflies of Africa